Luis Alberto Coppola Joffroy (born 29 May 1948) is a Mexican politician affiliated with the PAN. He served as Senator of the LX and LXI Legislatures of the Mexican Congress representing Baja California Sur.

References

1948 births
Living people
Politicians from Baja California Sur
Mexican businesspeople
Members of the Senate of the Republic (Mexico)
National Action Party (Mexico) politicians
Senators of the LX and LXI Legislatures of Mexico
21st-century Mexican politicians
Monterrey Institute of Technology and Higher Education alumni